Chrissie Rucker  (born 6 November 1968 in Edenbridge, Kent) is a British businesswoman, best known for founding British retailer The White Company in 1994. Because of her self-made success story and the similar products, she has been compared to Martha Stewart. Rucker is also a founding patron of the not-for-profit social enterprise, woman supporting women, The Princes Trust. 

Rucker's husband Nicholas Wheeler founded Charles Tyrwhitt, a menswear chain. Rucker was made an MBE in 2010 and in 2012 was chosen as Private Businesswoman of the Year by the Financial Times. She and her husband received OBE awards for their business success in December 2017.

Personal life
Rucker is married with four children to Nicholas Wheeler. Their collective net worth was estimated at £427 million according to the Sunday Times Rich List in 2020. Together they live in Buckinghamshire and also own a chalet in Klosters, Switzerland, named Haus Alpina.

References

1968 births
Living people
British retail company founders
People from Edenbridge, Kent
Officers of the Order of the British Empire